Fenger Academy High School  is a public 4–year high school located in the Roseland neighborhood on the far south side of Chicago, Illinois, United States. Fenger is a part of the Chicago Public Schools district. The school is named for Danish surgeon Christian Fenger. Fenger opened in 1893. Fenger, along with its former principal Elizabeth Dozier and numerous staff and students was featured prominently in the 2014 CNN documentary series Chicagoland.

History
When it opened in 1893, Fenger was known as Curtis School. The Chicago Board of Education renamed the school in 1915 in honor of a well-known Danish surgeon, Christian Fenger. The current Fenger building was constructed between 1924 and completed in 1926.

Athletics
Fenger competes in the Chicago Public League (CPL) and is a member of the Illinois High School Association (IHSA). The school sport teams are stylized as the Titans. The boys' baseball team won an Illinois state title and placed first in 1945–46 and were public league champions four times; 1945–46, 1951–52, 1970, 1985–86. Fenger football team won Chicago prep bowls titles four times; 1937–38, 1939–40, 1944–45, 1953–54. The boys' golf team were public league champions two times; 1970–71, 1972–73.  Fenger girls' basketball team were regional champions in 2012–13.

Notable alumni

 Andre Brown (1984) – NFL wide receiver (Miami Dolphins)
 Angeline Caruso (1940) – educator and educator administrator, Noted as the first woman to serve as superintendent of the Chicago Public Schools district 
 Eleanor Dapkus (1941) - baseball player
 Sammy Esposito (1949) – baseball player for Chicago White Sox

 Montell Griffin (1988) – boxer
 Larry "Flash" Jenkins (1973) - actor, film director, producer, and screenwriter 
 Eliot Ness (1921) – Prohibition agent, famed leader of The Untouchables
 Billy Rogell (1922) – MLB player (Boston Red Sox, Detroit Tigers, Chicago Cubs)
 Chuck Ulrich (1948) – football player
 Eleanor Wolf (1942)  – All-American Girls Professional Baseball League player.
 Robert Zemeckis  (1970) – screenwriter, Academy Award-winning director (Forrest Gump)
 Bob Zick (1945) – MLB player, Chicago Cubs (1954)

References

External links

 Official website

Public high schools in Chicago
Educational institutions established in 1893
1893 establishments in Illinois